= Owl Drug Co. Ltd. =

Pharmacy in Vancouver, Canada

Owl Drug Co. Ltd. (also known as The Owl Drug Company and Owl Drugs) is a Vancouver, British Columbia pharmacy that has operated continuously since at least 1910, making it one of the oldest continuously operating businesses in the city. Today a single store operates at 199 East Hastings Street, at the northwest corner of Main and Hastings, the same intersection the company has occupied since the early twentieth century. The company is remembered for its long commercial history, its distinctive owl mascot, and its role in Vancouver's neon-sign culture of the mid-twentieth century.

== Origins and founding ==
J. F. Jaeck was a drugist who established the original "Owl Drug" store at 76 Cordova Street, Vancouver, in the early 1890s. Jaeck is listed in the 1896 Vancouver City Directory as a "chemist and druggist" at that address, and appears in Henderson's British Columbia Gazetteer and Directory for 1889 alongside other early Vancouver pharmacists. He was also among the pharmacists registered as licentiates of pharmacy by the Pharmaceutical Association of British Columbia at its 1891 council meeting.

By June 1898 Jaeck became unwell and wished to travel to California. A brief item in The Province reported that McDowell, Atkins, Watson Company had purchased Jaeck's Owl Drug store, with J. M. Atkins taking charge.

== McDowell, Atkins, Watson Co. Ltd. (1895-1910) ==
The firm of McDowell, Atkins, Watson Co., Ltd. incorporated on 1 June 1895, amalgamating the businesses of two of Vancouver's oldest drug houses: H. McDowell & Co. and Atkins & Atkins. The amalgamation brought under one management two stores on Cordova and Granville streets owned by H. McDowell & Co., together with the Hastings Street store and the Nanaimo business of Atkins & Atkins.

A profile headlined "A Unique Business" in The Province (29 July 1899) described the resulting company as unique in its formation, being not only the largest retail drug house in the Dominion but the only one which owned and operated so many stores in a single city. The Nanaimo branch was subsequently sold, and around 1896 the firm purchased the Mount Pleasant branch from J. E. Morrow. Following the acquisition of Jaeck's store in the summer of 1898, the company operated five locations, described at the time as the largest aggregation of drug stores owned by one firm in Canada.

Senior partner H. McDowell had first opened his shop in Vancouver just after the Great Fire of 1886, making him for a time the only druggist in the city. He initially occupied premises on the opposite side of Cordova Street before moving to the Dunn-Miller Block when it was built in 1889. In 1889 H. H. Watson came to Vancouver and later joined McDowell as a partner; that same year Atkins & Atkins commenced business on Hastings Street. In 1889 H. McDowell & Co. also purchased the drug stock of Clarke & Robinson, and in 1891 bought the business of A. W. Draper on Granville Street.

By 1906 the company was advertising under the Owl Drug name as a special agent for Newbro's Herpicide, with three stores. A 1910 advertisement listed "Owl Drug Co., Ltd., three stores" as successors to McDowell, Atkins, Watson Co.

== Incorporation of Owl Drug Co. Ltd. (1910) ==
The Owl Drug Company Limited was incorporated on 13 October 1910, with incorporation number BC0000097. A Vancouver Daily Province article dated 16 December 1910 announced the transition under the headline "OWL DRUG COMPANY — Faithful Employees Take Over Business of Long-Established Company," reporting that the founding partners H. H. Watson, M.L.A. and J. M. Atkins had retired from active business to devote their attention to extensive realty holdings, selling out to long-serving employees, several of whom had been with the firm for ten to sixteen years.

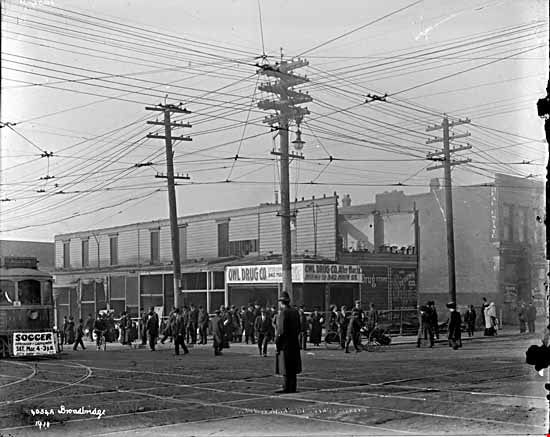
Owl Drug Company at the northwest corner of Hastings and Main Streets, Vancouver, BC, 1911. Photograph by R. Broadbridge

The officers of the new corporation were President J. M. Watson, Vice-President A. E. Black, Secretary J. C. McLeod, and Treasurer R. A. Sheppard. J. M. Watson continued in charge at the Granville Street store.

== Growth under the Owl Drug name (1910s-1920s) ==
By April 1912 the company had grown to four locations. An April 1912 article in The Province described the new store at the corner of Main and Hastings streets, in the Dawson Building, as having elaborate interior fittings and a large soda fountain. A further branch on Powell Street was also opened around the same time.

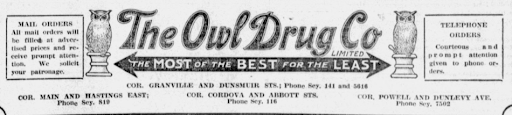
Advertisement for The Owl Drug Co. Ltd. showing four Vancouver locations and the company slogan "The Most of the Best for the Least." Published in the Vancouver Daily Province, November 6, 1913.

By 1913 the company was advertising four locations: corner of Granville and Dunsmuir streets; corner of Main and Hastings East; corner of Cordova and Abbott streets; and corner of Powell and Dunlevy Avenue, under the slogan "THE MOST OF THE BEST FOR THE LEAST." Advertisements emphasized a double-check prescription system, exclusively qualified druggists, and free delivery to all parts of the city.

Owl Drug stores served community functions beyond dispensing: excursion tickets for Canadian Pacific Railway sailings to Nanaimo were sold at the Main and Hastings store in 1912, the company sponsored a trophy at the 1912 Vancouver dog show for best English setter of opposite sex, and J. M. Watson served as an associate judge at the 1914 Vancouver automobile races at Minoru Park.

In 1921 the company extended its operations to Victoria, purchasing the business of Duncan Campbell, described in company advertising as one of the oldest and best-equipped drug businesses in British Columbia. By around 1930, according to Wrigley's British Columbia Directory, the company operated six Vancouver locations plus a Victoria store at Fort and Douglas Streets, under president John M. Watson, vice-president A. E. Black, and secretary-treasurer D. C. Dawson.

== The Ford Building, East Hastings ==
The company's East End flagship store at Main and Hastings occupied the Ford Building on East Hastings Street between Main Street and Columbia Street. The 1965 Greater Vancouver Criss Cross Street and Avenue Directory records Owl Drug Co. Ltd. at both 185 East Hastings and 193 East Hastings simultaneously. a double-fronted premises within the Ford Building. with the Toronto-Dominion Bank occupying the corner unit at 199 East Hastings.

By the 1960s the company was operating under the name Owl Rexall Drugs, reflecting an affiliation with the Rexall drug cooperative. City of Vancouver Archives photographs from September 1968 show "Owl Rexall Drugs in the Ford Building" at 185 East Hastings Street, and a further photograph from 1968-69 shows an Owl Rexall Drugs location at 501 Granville Street.

== Selected locations ==
Period	Address	Notes
c. 1892–1898	76 Cordova St	Original Jaeck "Owl Drug" store
c. 1895–1910	Cordova & Granville Sts	McDowell, Atkins, Watson stores
c. 1895–1910	Hastings St	Atkins & Atkins / McDowell Atkins Watson
1910–1989	Granville & Dunsmuir Sts	Main store under Owl Drug Co. Ltd.
By 1965–1989	185 & 193 E Hastings	Double-unit East End flagship, Ford Building
1990–present	199 E Hastings	Corner unit, former TD Bank space, Ford Building
c. 1912–c. 1989	Powell & Dunlevy Ave	
1921–c. 1980s	Fort & Douglas Sts, Victoria	Victoria branch
c. 1953–1989	1524 W 41st St	Site of the Hootie neon sign
c. 1985–1989	4255 Arbutus St	Arbutus Village Square; closed 1989
c. 1985–1989	698 Kingsway	Head office; closed 1989
c. 1985–1989	4421 W 10th	Closed 1989
c. 1985–1989	2625 Granville St	Closed 1989
c. 1985–1989	1290 Robson St	Closed 1989

== "Hootie" the neon owl (c. 1953) ==
One of the company's lasting legacies was a neon sign created around 1953 for the Owl Drug store at 1524 West 41st Street. Designed by Neon Products, the sign featured a character called Hootie, a Scottish owl in a red neon kilt, green neon socks, red neon shoes, a blue neon vest, bonnet, and sporran, with yellow neon head, eyes, and nose, and white neon wings. The animated figure appeared to run along the street carrying a package under his wing, with "We Deliver" in white neon script.

The sign drew controversy in the 1960s and 1970s, considered by some to be too garish and commercial. It was later acquired by the Museum of Vancouver, where it became one of the most popular pieces in the museum's neon collection. A 2011 Vancouver Sun article on the museum's Neon Vancouver/Ugly Vancouver exhibition described it as one of the most playful neon signs remaining from Vancouver's neon golden age of the 1940s and 1950s, noting that the Scottish character reflected Vancouver's large Scottish-heritage population in the 1950s.

== Receivership (1989) and consolidation ==
=== The collapse ===
By July 1985 the company operated seven locations across Greater Vancouver, with a head office at 698 Kingsway. This configuration remained unchanged through the 1989 Vancouver Telephone Directory.

Owl Drug Co. Ltd. was placed in receivership in September 1989. Jim Gilchrist, a spokesman for receiver Dunwoody Ltd., confirmed that company creditors had initiated the receivership. The stores at Arbutus Village Square and at Robson and Jervis were closed immediately and deemed unlikely to reopen, while three remaining Vancouver outlets continued to operate under the receiver. Gilchrist attributed the company's difficulties to competition from larger chains, noting that smaller stores could not match the dispensing fee pricing of competitors such as London Drugs, Shoppers Drug Mart, and Save-On-Foods.

The claim, made by Gilchrist in the same article, that Owl Drugs had at one time operated more than 100 outlets, has not been corroborated by any directory evidence in the historical record. The highest number of locations documented in city directories and telephone directories is seven, in the mid-1980s.

=== Consolidation to a single store ===
The 1990 Vancouver Telephone Directory shows only a single Owl Drugs listing: 199 East Hastings Street, telephone 681-3024, the same number that had appeared for the Hastings and Main location since at least 1985, confirming the store operated without interruption through the receivership.

By 1991, the former Owl Drug units at 185 and 193 East Hastings had been taken over by other tenants, Canadian Cheque Cashing Corp at 185 and the DERA Chinese Study Group at 193. Owl Drug had consolidated into the corner unit at 199 East Hastings, formerly occupied by the Toronto-Dominion Bank.

BC Corporate Registry records show that The Owl Drug Company Limited was never formally dissolved. Its status is recorded as "Conversion Dissolve Fail to File," indicating the company failed to complete formal dissolution paperwork. The 1989 receivership therefore represented a financial collapse and operational restructuring rather than a legal termination of the corporation.

== Present day ==
Owl Drugs continues to operate at 199 East Hastings Street, at the northwest corner of Main and Hastings in Vancouver's Downtown Eastside. The store provides full pharmacy services to the surrounding community and offers harm reduction services including free naloxone kits and overdose recognition training. It holds Pharmacy Licence #15377 with the College of Pharmacists of British Columbia.
